Mary Norton may refer to:

 Mary Norton (author), British author of the series The Borrowers
 Mary Beth Norton, American historian
 Mary D. Herter Norton, co-founder of W. W. Norton & Company, also known as M. D. Herter Norton for work as violinist and translator.
 Mary Teresa Norton, American congresswoman
 Andre Norton, American author, born Alice Mary Norton